Bicycle law is the parts of law that apply to the riding of bicycles.

Bicycle law varies from country to country, but in general, cyclists' right to the road has been enshrined in international law since 1968, with the accession of the Vienna Convention on Road Traffic. Under that treaty, bicycles have the legal status of vehicles, and cyclists enjoy the legal status of vehicle operators. There are over 150 contracting parties to the treaty, including the United States, Canada, Mexico, the United Kingdom, Ireland, almost all of Europe, Australia, New Zealand, Japan, and China. In countries that are contracting parties, the treaty has the force of law, and its provisions have been incorporated into national law.

The position of British cyclists was first established by the Local Government Act in August, 1888. It removed the right of local councils to treat cyclists among the "nuisances" it could ban and defined them as "carriages"."

National

Australia

Cyclists in every state in Australia are required to follow normal road rules, including using traffic lights correctly and observing give way and stop signs while riding on the road. Cyclists in every state must also wear helmets while in motion. All cyclists must only use the left hand lane, except in Queensland. All states require only one passenger per bicycle unless the bicycle is designed otherwise. They are required to use a bike light when riding at night in Western Australia, Tasmania, Northern Territory, South Australia and Queensland.

Bike users in Western Australia and Tasmania must use both hand signals, while in Victoria, Queensland and Northern Territory cyclists must signal when turning right but it is not compulsory when turning left. New South Wales cyclists over 18 must carry personal identification. Cyclist must have at least one hand on handle bars in Western Australia, Northern Territory and Queensland.

Cyclist may ride on standard footpaths in Western Australia, Northern Territory, South Australia and Australian Capital Territory. In Victoria and New South Wales cyclists can only ride on a footpath if they're under the age of 12 or supervising a child under 12, or have a disability which restrains them from being able to ride on the road. In Queensland cyclists can ride on any path as long as there isn’t a sign stating otherwise. Cyclists may ride in pairs in South Australia and the two rows must be no more than 1.5 meters apart in Western Australia and Queensland. Cyclists must ride single file in Northern Territory and Australian Capital Territory unless overtaking. Cyclists across Australia must follow the same rules as motor vehicle drivers in regards to using mobile phones and consuming alcohol.

United States

Although bicycle law is a relatively new specialty within the law, first appearing in the late 1980s, its roots date back to the 1880s and 1890s, when cyclists were using the courts to assert a legal right to use the roads. In 1895, George B. Clementson, an American attorney, wrote The Road Rights and Liabilities of Wheelmen, the first book on bicycle law, in which he discussed the seminal cases of the 1880s and 1890s, which were financed by Albert Pope of Columbia Bicycles, and through which cyclists gained the right to the road.

By the mid-1980s, a substantial body of law pertaining to bicycles had developed, and a few attorneys in the United States had begun specializing in bicycle law. Today, attorneys specializing in bicycle law represent professional athletes, as well as average cyclists, on issues ranging from professional contracts, to traffic accidents, to traffic tickets. In addition, attorneys specializing in bicycle law may advise cyclists on other legal issues, such as bicycle theft, insurance, harassment of cyclists, defective products law, and non-professional contractual issues.

See also
 Outline of cycling
 Bicycle helmet laws
 Electric bicycle laws
 Transport law

References